Go Yeong-hui (born 23 March 1956) is a South Korean sports shooter. She competed in the women's 50 metre rifle three positions event at the 1984 Summer Olympics.

References

1956 births
Living people
South Korean female sport shooters
Olympic shooters of South Korea
Shooters at the 1984 Summer Olympics
Place of birth missing (living people)
Shooters at the 1978 Asian Games
Asian Games competitors for South Korea
20th-century South Korean women
21st-century South Korean women